Edward A. Eckenhoff is founder and president of the National Rehabilitation Hospital in Washington, DC. He had previously been vice president and administrator of the Rehabilitation Institute of Chicago. The  NRH employs 1,000 staff including over 200 physicians.

In 1988, Eckenhoff was awarded the Citation of a Layman for Distinguished Service, the highest honor bestowed on a non-physician by the American Medical Association. In 1989, Eckenhoff was named "Washingtonian of the Year" by Washingtonian magazine.

Education
B.S. in Biology from Transylvania University in Kentucky in 1966
Master's degree in Education and Psychology from the University of Kentucky in 1968
Master's degree in Health Care Administration from  the Washington University School of Medicine

External links 
 National Rehabilitation Hospital
 Transylvania University press release Author Stephen King tells Eckenhoff's story in "Tribute to Courage."
 MedStar Health  Brief biography.

Year of birth missing (living people)
Living people
Washington University School of Medicine alumni
Transylvania University alumni
University of Kentucky alumni
University of Georgia alumni
American company founders
American hospital administrators